Adonia Ayebare, (born 18 October 1966) is a Ugandan journalist and diplomat who currently serves as Uganda's Permanent Representative to the United Nations, effective March 2017. Before that, from January 2013, until March 2017, he served as the Senior Adviser on Peace and Security at the African Union's Permanent Observer Mission to the United Nations in New York City.

Background and education
He holds a Bachelor of Arts in Mass Communication, obtained in 1993, from Makerere University, in Kampala, Uganda's capital city. He has two Master of Arts degrees, one from Long Island University and the other from Tufts University's Fletcher School of Law and Diplomacy. His two doctoral degrees were obtained from Indiana University and Rutgers University in the United States.

Career
From 1996 until 1998, Ayebare worked as a staff reporter at the East African Business Week, based in Kampala. Between 1998 and 2000, he served as an information officer with the Integrated Regional Information Network (IRIN).

His diplomatic career began in 2001 when he was appointed as Uganda’s Principal Adviser and Special Envoy to the Burundi peace process, serving in that capacity until 2008. Between 2002 and 2005, he served as Uganda's Ambassador and Head of Mission to Rwanda and Burundi.

In 2005, he was transferred to Uganda's mission at the United Nations, based in New York, serving as Deputy Permanent Representative and Chargé d’affaires, until 2008. In 2009, he was appointed as Director of the Africa Program at the "International Peace Institute", a think tank, based in New York, serving there until 2011. From 2010 until 2012, he went back to serve as Deputy Head of Uganda's mission to the UN, based in New York City.

Other considerations
Adonia Ayebare is a married father of five children.

See also
 East African Community
 Ministry of Foreign Affairs (Uganda)
 Richard Nduhura

References

External links
 Website of Uganda's Permanent Mission to the United Nations, based in New York City

1966 births
Living people
Ugandan diplomats
Ugandan journalists
Makerere University alumni
Long Island University alumni
Indiana University alumni
Rutgers University alumni
People from Western Region, Uganda
Harvard Kennedy School alumni
The Fletcher School at Tufts University alumni
Permanent Representatives of Uganda to the United Nations